"A Step in the Right Direction" is a song written by Robert and Richard Sherman for the 1971, Walt Disney musical film production Bedknobs and Broomsticks.

Lost scene
Upon rediscovering the song on the original soundtrack album, Disney decided to reconstruct the original running length of Bedknobs and Broomsticks, with all the songs. Most of the film material was found, but one minute of another song, "Portobello Road", had to be reconstructed from a work print with digital re-coloration to match the film quality of the main content. The footage for "A Step in the Right Direction" was never located. For many decades, it remains lost, and it is possible that the footage was accidentally destroyed. However, records show that the song was part of the film before the Radio City engagement. Theoretically, it’s possible that if one of those prints still exists, the picture portion might be found there.  Until that theory is explored, a reconstruction of the sequence, using the original music track linked up to existing production stills, was included as a DVD extra to convey an idea of what it would have looked like in the film.

References

 Sherman, Robert B. Walt's Time: from before to beyond. Santa Clarita: Camphor Tree Publishers, 1998.

Songs from Bedknobs and Broomsticks
1971 songs
Songs written by the Sherman Brothers